Ha Yoon-kyung (born 20 October 1992) is a South Korean actress, best known for her appearances in television series Hospital Playlist (2020–2021) and Extraordinary Attorney Woo (2022).

Filmography

Film

Television series

Web series

Awards and nominations

References

External links 
 
 

1992 births
Living people
21st-century South Korean actresses
South Korean television actresses
South Korean film actresses
Korea National University of Arts alumni